Callionymoidei is a suborder of the Perciformes, the largest order of fish. The suborder includes the dragonets.

References 

 
Ray-finned fish suborders